Milton Robert Nielsen (February 8, 1925 – August 1, 2005) was an American Major League Baseball center fielder who played for two seasons. After retiring from baseball after the 1954 minor league he purchased a Chevrolet dealership in St. Peter, Minnesota. He is buried in Resurrection Cemetery in St. Peter.

External links

1925 births
2005 deaths
Bakersfield Indians players
Baseball players from Minnesota
Cleveland Indians players
Indianapolis Indians players
Major League Baseball center fielders
Oklahoma City Indians players
People from St. Peter, Minnesota
San Diego Padres (minor league) players
People from Tyler, Minnesota